Helladia humeralis is a species of longhorn beetle in the subfamily Lamiinae found in Iran, Turkey and Near East. It is black coloured with orange legs and antennae. Adults are on wing from April to June. It feeds on Centaurea hyalolepis, which is also its host plant.

References

External links
Helladia humeralis on Flickr
Helladia humeralis on Zin.ru

Lamiinae
Beetles described in 1828
Beetles of Asia
Taxa named by Joseph Waltl